This is a list of the principal holders of government office during the premiership of the Earl of Shelburne between July 1782 and April 1783.

Upon the fall of the North ministry in March 1782, Whig Lord Rockingham became Prime Minister for a second time. He died in office four months later, and Home Secretary Lord Shelburne was invited to form a government. However, Charles James Fox and several other former Rockinghamites (including Cavendish and Burke) refused to serve under Shelburne and went into opposition. The Foxites allied with the supporters of Lord North to bring down the government, and the Fox–North coalition came to power in April 1783. This government did not long survive the hostility of King George III, and many of Shelburne's ministers returned to office under the leadership of William Pitt the Younger in December 1783, though Shelburne himself was consoled with the title Marquess of Lansdowne.

Cabinet
:

Changes
January 1783 – Lord Howe succeeds Lord Keppel at the Admiralty.

Ministers not in Cabinet
 Henry Seymour ConwayCommander-in-Chief of the Forces
 Henry DundasTreasurer of the Navy
 Sir George YongeSecretary at War
 Isaac BarréPaymaster of the Forces
 The Duke of RutlandLord Steward of the Household

Notes

References

 
 

British ministries
Government
1782 establishments in Great Britain
1783 disestablishments in Great Britain
Ministries of George III of the United Kingdom
1780s in Great Britain